FabricLive.48 is a 2009 album by Filthy Dukes. The album was released as part of the FabricLive Mix Series.

Track listing
 Filthy Dukes - This Rhythm (Emperor Machine Remix) - Fiction
 Phenomenal Handclap Band - You'll Disappear - Tummy Touch
 WhoMadeWho - The Plot (Discodeine Remix) - Gomma
 Hockey - Learn to Lose (Filthy Dukes Remix) - Capitol
 Sparks - Beat the Clock - Sparks/Giorgio Moroder Enterprise
 Alan Braxe & Fred Falke - Most Wanted - Vulture
 Sébastien Tellier - Kilometer (Aeroplane Mix) - Lucky Number
 80kidz - Miss Mars - KSR Corp
 Filthy Dukes - Twenty Six Hundred (Album Version) - Fiction
 POPOF - Serenity (Noob remix) - Form Music
 Audio Soul Project - Reality Check (Vincenzo Remix) - Dessous
 Mujava - Township Funk - This is Music
 Dataworx - Control (Original Mix) - Solarscape
 Noob & Brodinski - Peanuts Club - Turbo
 Joakim - Watermelon Bubblicious - Versatile
 Zombie Nation - Worth It, Part 1 - UKW Records
 Aphex Twin - Windowlicker - Warp
 Tiga - What You Need (Proxy Remix) - Different Recordings
 Daft Punk - Robot Rock (Soulwax Remix) - Virgin
 Mr Oizo - Pourriture 7 - Ed Banger
 Jack Peñate - Tonight's Today - XL Recordings
 Lifelike - Sequencer - Vulture
 Filthy Dukes - Messages (Filthy Dukes Kill Em All Remix) - Fiction

References

External links
Fabric: FabricLive.48

Fabric (club) albums
2009 compilation albums
Filthy Dukes albums